Rawica Nowa  is a village in the administrative district of Gmina Tczów, within Zwoleń County, Masovian Voivodeship, in east-central Poland.

The village has a population of 93.

References

Rawica Nowa